First awarded in 2001, the Green Chemistry Award is presented every two years by the Royal Society of Chemistry (RSC) for advances in environmentally focused chemistry. In addition to a prize of £2000, winners of the award complete a UK based lecture tour. The Award was last presented in 2016.

Winners 
 2020: , Ecole Polytechnique Fédérale de Lausanne
 , University of York, for the promotion of applied, market-driven green chemistry.

See also

 List of chemistry awards
 List of environmental awards

References

Awards of the Royal Society of Chemistry
2001 establishments in the United Kingdom
British awards
Environmental awards